Oshunmare (known as Ochumaré or Oxumaré in Latin America) is an Orisha. Osumare is the spirit of the rainbow, and Osumare also means rainbow in the Yoruba language.

See also 
 Aido Wedo

References

Life-death-rebirth deities
Yoruba deities
Legendary serpents
Brazilian deities
Candomblé